Paula Devine is a former educator and politician from California. Devine is a former mayor and current member of city council in Glendale, California.

Education 
Devine earned a master's degree in education administration from California State University, Los Angeles.

Career 
Devine is a former teacher and coach at San Gabriel High School.

Devine is a former guest lecturer in Women's Studies Program at Glendale Community College.

On June 3, 2014, Devine won the special election and became a member of city council in Glendale, California. Devine received 33.69% of the votes. Devine replaced Frank Quintero, who was appointed to replace Rafi Manoukian, who was elected as the city treasurer.

In 2015, as an incumbent, Devine won the election and continued serving as a member of the city council for Glendale, California.

In April 2016, Devine became the mayor of Glendale, California, until April 2017.

Awards 
 2013 Woman of the Year. Presented by Adam Schiff.
 2018 Woman of the Year. Presented by Glendale Latino Association.
 2019 Community Leader Courage Award (October 24, 2019). Presented by The Guild at Adventist Health Glendale.

Personal life 
Devine's husband is Arthur Devine. Devine and her family live in Glendale, California.

References

External links 
 Glendale City Council Special Election in June (February 20, 2014)
 Paula Devine at votesmart.org

California State University, Los Angeles alumni
Living people
Mayors of Glendale, California
Women mayors of places in California
Year of birth missing (living people)
21st-century American women